Sofar may refer to:

 Sofar bomb (SOund Fixing And Ranging bomb), a long-range position-fixing system that uses explosive sounds in the deep sound channel of the ocean
 SOFAR channel (SOund Fixing And Ranging channel), a horizontal layer of water in the ocean centered on the depth at which the speed of sound is minimum
 Sofar Sounds, music events company

See also
 Shofar, a musical instrument
 Sawfar, a village in Lebanon